Ngai (also called Múrungu or Enkai) is the monolithic Supreme God in the spirituality of the Kikuyu (or Gikuyu) and the closely related Embu, Meru and Kamba groups of Kenya, and the Maasai of Kenya and Tanzania. Ngai is creator of the universe and all in it. Regarded as the omnipotent God, the Kikuyu, Embu, Meru, Kamba and the Maasai of Kenya worshiped Ngai facing the  Mt. Kirinyaga (Mount Kenya) while prayers and goat sacrificial rituals were performed under the sacred Mugumo tree (a fig tree species). Occasions which may warrant sacrifice or libation include times of drought; epidemics; during planting and harvesting; and human life stages such as birth, marriage and death.

Ngai in Kikuyu, Embu, Meru and Kamba Worship
Ngai was often referred to as "Mwene Nyaga", meaning "Owner of the Dazzling Light". Kenyan anthropologist, later president, Jomo Kenyata notes that: "In prayers and sacrifices Ngai is addressed by the Gikuyu as Mwene-Nyaga (possessor of brightness)." He went on to write that: "This name is associated with Kĩrĩ-Nyaga (the Gikuyu name for Mount Kenya), which means: That which possesses brightness, or mountain of brightness."<ref>Kenyata, Jomo, 'Facing Mount Kenya, (chapter: "The Conception of a Deity") [in] Ben-Jochannan, Yosef, African Origins of the Major "Western Religions", Black Classic Press (reprint, 1991),  pp. 42-49,  (Retrieved 5 April 2019)</ref>

According to Kikuyu creation myth,  Ngai created humanity, first man called Gikuyu and first woman called Mumbi. Ngai created a mountain "As his resting place when on inspection tour and as a sign of his wonders." Gĩkũyũ and Mũmbi bore nine daughters who became the origins of 9 clans of Kikuyu people. "The names of the main clans are: (1) Acheera; (2) Agachikũ; (3) Airimũ; (4) Ambũi; (5) Angarĩ; (6) Anjirũ; (7) Angũi; (8) Ethaga; (9) Aithĩrandũ."  

Ngai in Maasai Worship

For the Maasai, Ngai (also called Engai or Enkai) is the androgynous Supreme Creator, possessing both masculine and feminine principles. The Maasai  refer to Ngai's primordial dwelling as "Ol Doinyo Lengai" which literally means "The Mountain of God" , which they believe is in Northern Tanzania.

Ngai or Enkai's name is synonymous to "rain."

In Maasai religion, the Laibon (plural: Laiboni) intercedes between the world of the living and the Creator.  They are the Maasai's high priests and diviners.  In addition to organizing and presiding over religious ceremonies—including sacrifice and libation, they also heal the living, physically and spiritually.

See also
God in Bantu mythology
List of solar deities

References

Bibliography
Kenyata, Jomo, Facing Mount Kenya, (introduction by B. Malinowski) originally published by Martin Secker & Warburg LTD, (1938), [in] South African History Online, pp. 22–23, 41, 233-234,  (Retrieved 5 April 2019)
Ben-Jochannan, Yosef, African Origins of the Major "Western Religions", Black Classic Press (reprint, 1991), pp. 42–49,   (Retrieved 5 April 2019) 
Middleton, John; Kershaw, Greet; The Kikuyu and Kamba of Kenya: East Central Africa, Part 5, Routledge (reprint, 2017), p. 128,   (Retrieved 5 April 2019)
Kenyatta, Jomo (1965). Facing Mt. Kenya (2nd ed.). Vintage Books. p. 175
Olney, James, Tell Me Africa: An Approach to African Literature, Princeton University Press (2015), p. 88,  Retrieved 5 April 2019)

Further reading
J. N. van Luijk, Traditional Medicine Among the Kamba of Machakos District,'' Kenya, Volume 2, Royal Tropical Institute, Department of Tropical Hygiene, Sub. Department of Tropical Health (1982), Indiana University

External links
Ngai, The High God of the Kikuyu

African gods
Bantu mythology
Creator gods
Creation myths
Names of God
Religion in Kenya
Solar gods
Maasai deities
Names of God in African traditional religions